is a life simulation video game published and developed by Namco Bandai Games for the Nintendo DS handheld video game console. It is the sequel to Tamagotchi Connection: Corner Shop, also released for the Nintendo DS. It was followed by Tamagotchi Connection: Corner Shop 3.

Gameplay
The player once again partners up with the same Tamagotchi characters from the first game and must try to make all shops royal. After all shops become royal, Princess Tamako is unlocked as a partner, but the game will not be saved. The currency used in the game is called gotchi.

The game begins with the player choosing a four-letter name, with the suffix  "-tchi" automatically added to the end to define the player as a Tamagotchi, like the rest of the characters. After choosing one of three potential partners, a short scene is featured in with the player's chosen partner reveals that they have won the Tamagotchi Lottery, with prize money of 10,000 gotchi which are used to purchase shops.

In this game, many of the Tamagotchis from the first game return, while some do not. Many of the new ones are from Tamagotchi Connection V4, Tamagotchi School, and Uratama. At the beginning of the game, the player must choose a name and a partner. There are three potential partners: Memetchi, Kuchipatchi, and Mametchi.

Tamagotchi Connection: Corner Shop 2 features twelve playable shops that are played through screen interaction. After serving a customer at each shop, the player is paid an amount of gotchi and is given a review.  The possible reviews are Try Harder, meaning that the service was inadequate, Great Job, meaning that the service was satisfactory yet not perfect, and Awesome Job, meaning that the service was completed completely towards the customer's standards.  Each time the player serves a customer and is paid, the shop's reputation rises depending on their review. When the reputation rises to a certain level, Princess Tamako pays a visit, and once she is served she offers to renovate the shop.  There are four shop levels: The first level is Puchi, which is the stage the shop is in when it is first bought, whereas the following levels are Metchi, Gotchi, and Royal.

When the player first purchases a shop, only four of the twelve are available: Cake Shop, Burger Shop, Flower Shop and Gas Station. After boosting one or numerous shops to certain stages, an additional six shops are made available: Flight, Concert Hall, Clinic, Boutique, Bowling, and Sushi Bar.  The final two shops are Sushi-Bowl and Music Clinic; the Sushi-Bowl can only be unlocked by boosting both the Sushi Bar and the Bowling shop to the Royal Stage, whereas the Music Clinic can only be unlocked through boosting both the Concert Hall and Clinic to royal. The combined Sushi-Bowl and Music Clinic do not require going through the Metchi and Gotchi stages in order to become royal; after the first visit from Princess Tamako, she renovates the shop from putchi to royal.

Reception
Tamagotchi Connection: Corner Shop 2 was the top-selling game in Japan during its week of release, selling 192,458 copies. The game had sold 713,237 copies in the region by the end of 2006, making it the 14th best-selling game in Japan that year right after Bandai and Namco Bandai Games called it "Tamagotchi! Miracle Friends".

See also 
 Tamagotchi
 Tamagotchi Connection: Corner Shop
 Tamagotchi Connection: Corner Shop 3

References

External links 
  

2006 video games
Bandai Namco games
Dimps games
Multiplayer and single-player video games
Nintendo DS games
Nintendo DS-only games
Tamagotchi video games
Video games based on toys
Video games developed in Australia
Video games developed in Japan